Und tschüss! is a German television series.

See also
List of German television series

External links
 

1994 German television series debuts
1998 German television series endings
German comedy television series
Television shows set in North Rhine-Westphalia
German-language television shows
RTL (German TV channel) original programming